Comer Vann Woodward (November 13, 1908 – December 17, 1999) was an American historian who focused primarily on the American South and race relations.  He was long a supporter of the approach of Charles A. Beard, stressing the influence of unseen economic motivations in politics. Stylistically, he was a master of irony and counterpoint. Woodward was on the left end of the history profession in the 1930s. By  the 1950s he was a leading liberal and supporter of civil rights. His book The Strange Career of Jim Crow, which demonstrated that racial segregation was an invention of the late 19th century rather than an inevitable post-Civil-War development, was endorsed by Martin Luther King Jr. as "the historical Bible of the civil rights movement".  After attacks on him by the New Left in the late 1960s, he moved to the right politically. He won a Pulitzer Prize for History for his annotated edition of Mary Chestnut's Civil War diaries.

Early life and education
C. Vann Woodward was born in Vanndale, Arkansas, a town named after his mother's family and the county seat from 1886 to 1903.  It was in Cross County in eastern Arkansas. Woodward attended high school in Morrilton, Arkansas. He attended Henderson-Brown College, a small Methodist school in Arkadelphia, for two years. In 1930 he transferred to Emory University in Atlanta, Georgia, where his uncle was dean of students and professor of sociology. After graduating, he taught English composition for two years at Georgia Tech in Atlanta. There he met Will W. Alexander, head of the Commission on Interracial Cooperation, and J. Saunders Redding, a historian at Atlanta University.

Woodward enrolled in graduate school at Columbia University in 1931 and received his M.A. from that institution in 1932. In New York, Woodward met, and was influenced by, W. E. B. Du Bois, Langston Hughes, and other figures who were associated with the Harlem Renaissance movement. After receiving his master's degree in 1932, Woodward worked for the defense of Angelo Herndon, a young African-American Communist Party member who had been accused of subversive activities. He also traveled to the Soviet Union and Germany in 1932.

He did graduate work in history and sociology at the University of North Carolina. He was granted a Ph.D. in history in 1937, using as his dissertation the manuscript he had already finished on Thomas E. Watson. Woodward's dissertation director was Howard K. Beale, a Reconstruction specialist who promoted the Beardian economic interpretation of history that deemphasized ideology and ideas and stressed material self-interest as a motivating factor.

In World War II, Woodward served in the Navy, assigned to write the history of major battles. His The Battle for Leyte Gulf (1947) became the standard study of the largest naval battle in history.

Career
Woodward, starting out on the left politically, wanted to use history to explore dissent. He approached W. E. B. Du Bois about writing about him, and thought of following his biography of Watson with one of Eugene V. Debs.  He picked Georgia politician Tom Watson, who in the 1890s was a populist leader focusing the anger and hatred of poor whites against the establishment, banks, railroads and businessmen. Watson in 1908 was the presidential candidate of the Populist Party, but this time was the leader in mobilizing the hatred of the same poor whites against blacks, and a promoter of lynching.

The Strange Career of Jim Crow
Woodward's most influential book was The Strange Career of Jim Crow (1955), which explained that segregation was a relatively late development and was not inevitable. After the Supreme Court's decision in Brown v. Board of Education, in spring 1954, Woodward gave the Richards Lectures at the University of Virginia. The lectures were published in 1955 as The Strange Career of Jim Crow. With Woodward in the audience in Montgomery, Alabama, in March 1965, Martin Luther King Jr. proclaimed the book "the historical bible of the Civil Rights Movement."  It reached a large popular audience and helped shape the civil rights movement of the 1950s and 1960s.

Jim Crow laws, Woodward argued, were not part of the immediate aftermath of Reconstruction; they came later and were not inevitable.  Following the Compromise of 1877, into the 1880s there were localized informal practices of racial separation in some areas of society along with what he termed "forgotten alternatives" in others. Finally the 1890s saw white southerners "capitulate to racism" to create "legally prescribed, rigidly enforced, state-wide Jim Crowism."

Origins of the New South, 1877–1913
Origins of the New South, 1877–1913 was published in 1951 by Louisiana State University Press as multivolume history of the South. It combined the Beardian theme of economic forces shaping history and the Faulknerian tone of tragedy and decline. He insisted on the discontinuity of the era and rejected both the romantic antebellum popular images of the Lost Cause school and the overoptimistic business boosterism of the New South Creed. Sheldon Hackney, a Woodward student, hailed the book.

Appointments, teaching and awards
Woodward was elected to the American Academy of Arts and Sciences in 1958 and the American Philosophical Society in 1959.

Woodward taught at Johns Hopkins University from 1946 to 1961. He became Sterling Professor of History at Yale from 1961 to 1977, where he taught both graduate students and undergraduates. He did much writing but little original research at Yale, frequently writing essays for such outlets as the New York Review of Books.  He directed scores of PhD dissertations, including those by
 John W. Blassingame, former chair of the African American studies program at Yale;
 Daniel W. Crofts, former chair of the History Department at The College of New Jersey;
 James M. McPherson, Professor of History at Princeton University;
 Patricia Nelson Limerick, Professor of History at the University of Colorado at Boulder;
 Michel Wayne, Professor of History at the University of Toronto;
 Steven Hahn, Professor of History at the University of Pennsylvania;
 John Herbert Roper, Richardson Chair of American History at Emory & Henry College;
 David L. Carlton, Professor of History at Vanderbilt University; and
 Barbara Fields, Professor of History at Columbia University.

In 1974, the United States House Committee on the Judiciary asked Woodward for an historical study of misconduct in previous administrations and how the Presidents responded. Woodward led a group of fourteen historians, and they produced a 400-page report in less than four months, Responses of the Presidents to Charges of Misconduct.

In 1978 the National Endowment for the Humanities selected Woodward for the Jefferson Lecture, the federal government's highest honor for achievement in the humanities. His lecture, entitled "The European Vision of America," was later incorporated into his book The Old World's New World.

Woodward won the Pulitzer Prize in 1982 for Mary Chesnut's Civil War, an edited version of Mary Chesnut's Civil War diary. He won the Bancroft Prize for Origins of the New South.

Move to the Right
Peter Novick says, "Vann Woodward was always very conflicted about the 'presentism' of his work. He alternated between denying it, qualifying it, and apologizing for it." British historian Michael O'Brien, the editor of Woodward's letters in 2013, says that by the 1970s

He became greatly troubled by the rise of the black power movement, disliked affirmative action, never came to grips with feminism, mistrusted what came to be known as "theory," and became a strong opponent of multiculturalism and "political correctness."

In 1969, as president of the American Historical Association, Woodward led the fight to defeat a proposal by New Left historians to politicize the organization. He wrote his daughter afterwards, "The preparations paid off and I had pretty well second-guessed the Rads on every turn."

In 1975–6 Woodward led the unsuccessful fight at Yale to block the temporary appointment of Communist historian Herbert Aptheker to teach a course. Radicals denounced his actions but a joint committee of the Organization of American Historians and the American Historical Association exonerated the process and found that there was no evidence that political criteria had been used. In 1987 he joined the conservative scholars who made up the National Association of Scholars, a group explicitly opposed to the academic Left. Woodward wrote a favorable review in the New York Review of Books of Dinesh D'Souza's Illiberal Education: The Politics of Race and Sex on Campus. It said that Duke University used racial criteria when it hired John Hope Franklin; Franklin and Woodward publicly feuded. Hackney says, "Woodward became an open critic of political correctness and in other ways appeared to have shifted his seat at the political table."

Death and legacy
C. Vann Woodward died December 17, 1999, in Hamden, Connecticut, at the age of 91.

Woodward cautioned that the academicians had themselves abdicated their role as storytellers:Professionals do well to apply the term "amateur" with caution to the historian outside their ranks. The word does have deprecatory and patronizing connotations that occasionally backfire. This is especially true of narrative history, which nonprofessionals have all but taken over. The gradual withering of the narrative impulse in favor of the analytical urge among professional academic historians has resulted in a virtual abdication of the oldest and most honored role of the historian, that of storyteller. Having abdicated... the professional is in a poor position to patronize amateurs who fulfill the needed function he has abandoned.

The Southern Historical Association has established the C. Vann Woodward Dissertation Prize, awarded annually to the best dissertation on Southern history. There is a Peter V. and C. Vann Woodward Chair of History at Yale; it is now held by southern historian Glenda Gilmore. (Peter was Woodward's son, who died at age 26 in 1969.)

He was a Charter member of the Fellowship of Southern Writers.

Works

Books
Tom Watson, Agrarian Rebel (1938)
The Battle for Leyte Gulf (1947, new ed. 1965)
Origins of the New South, 1877–1913 (1951) borrow for 14 days
Reunion and Reaction: The Compromise of 1877 and the End of Reconstruction (1951, rev. ed. 1991)
The Strange Career of Jim Crow. (1st ed. February 1955; 2nd ed. August 1965; 3rd ed. NY:Oxford University Press, 1974).  . borrow for 14 days
The Age of Reinterpretation (1961).  pamphlet
The Burden of Southern History (1955; 3rd ed. 1993)
 The Comparative Approach to American History (1968),  editor
American Counterpoint (1971). essays
Mary Chesnut's Civil War (1981), editor. Pulitzer prize.
Oxford History of the United States (1982–2018), series editor.
The Private Mary Chestnut: The Unpublished Civil War Diaries (1984) edited, with Elizabeth Muhlenfeld.
 Thinking Back: The Perils of Writing History (Louisiana State University Press, 1986). memoirs
 The Old World's New World (1991). lectures
 The Letters of C. Vann Woodward. edited by Michael O'Brien, (Yale University Press, 2013)

Major journal articles
 "Tom Watson and the Negro in Agrarian Politics". Journal of Southern History, Vol. 4, No. 1 (Feb., 1938), pp. 14–33.
 "The Irony of Southern History". Journal of Southern History, Vol. 19, No. 1 (Feb., 1953), pp. 3–19.
 "The Political Legacy of Reconstruction". Journal of Negro Education, Vol. 26, No. 3, The Negro Voter in the South (Summer, 1957), pp. 231–240.
 "The Age of Reinterpretation". American Historical Review, Vol. 66, No. 1 (Oct., 1960), pp. 1–19.
 "Seeds of Failure in Radical Race Policy". Proceedings of the American Philosophical Society, Vol. 110, No. 1 (Feb. 18, 1966), pp. 1–9.
 "History and the Third Culture".  Journal of Contemporary History, Vol. 3, No. 2, Reappraisals (Apr., 1968), pp. 23–35.
 "The Southern Ethic in a Puritan World". William and Mary Quarterly, Vol. 25, No. 3 (Jul., 1968), pp. 344–370.
 "Clio With Soul". Journal of American History, Vol. 56, No. 1 (June, 1969), pp. 5–20.
 "The Future of the Past". American Historical Review, Vol. 75, No. 3 (Feb., 1970), pp. 711–726.
 "The Erosion of Academic Privileges and Immunities". Daedalus, Vol. 103, No. 4, (Fall, 1974), pp. 33–37.
 "The Aging of America". American Historical Review, Vol. 82, No. 3 (Jun., 1977), pp. 583–594.
 "The Fall of the American Adam". Bulletin of the American Academy of Arts and Sciences, Vol. 35, No. 2 (Nov., 1981), pp. 26–34.
 "Strange Career Critics: Long May they Persevere". Journal of American History, Vol. 75, No. 3 (Dec., 1988), pp. 857–868.
 "Look Away, Look Away". Journal of Southern History, Vol. 59, No. 3 (Aug., 1993), pp. 487–504.

References

Further reading
 Boles, John B. and Bethany L. Johnson, eds. Origins of the New South Fifty Years Later (2003), articles by scholars online review
 Cobb, James, C. Vann Woodward: America's Historian (2022). North Carolina Press. . Review by Eric Foner
 Ferrell, Robert. "C. Vann Woodward" in Clio's Favorites: Leading Historians of the United States, 1945–2000. ed. by Robert Allen Rutland (2000) pp. 170–81
 Hackney, Sheldon. "Origins of the New South in Retrospect," Journal of Southern History (1972) 38#2  pp. 191–216 in JSTOR
 Hackney, Sheldon. "C. Vann Woodward: 13 November 1908 – 17 December 1999," Proceedings of the American Philosophical Society (2001) 145#2 pp. 233–240 in JSTOR
 Hackney, Sheldon. "C. Vann Woodward, Dissenter," Historically Speaking (2009) 10#1 pp. 31–34 in Project MUSE
 Kousser, J. Morgan and James M. McPherson, eds. Religion, Race and Reconstruction: Essays in Honor of C. Vann Woodward (1982), festschrift of articles; also lists most of his Ph.D. students
 Lerner, Mitchell, "Conquering the Hearts of the People: Lyndon Johnson, C. Vann Woodward, and 'The Irony of Southern History,'" Southwestern Historical Quarterly 115 (Oct. 2011), 155–71.
 Potter, David M. "C. Vann Woodward," in Pastmasters: Some Essays on American Historians, ed. Marcus Cunliffe and Robin W. Winks (1969).
 Rabinowitz, Howard N. "More Than the Woodward Thesis: Assessing The Strange Career of Jim Crow," Journal of American History (1988) 75#3 pp. 842–856 in JSTOR
 Woodward, C. Vann. "Strange Career Critics: Long May They Persevere," Journal of American History (1988) 75#3 pp. 857–868. a reply to Rabinowitz in JSTOR
 Roper, John Herbert. C. Vann Woodward, Southerner (1987), biography
 Roper, John Herbert, ed. C. Vann Woodward: A Southern Historian and His Critics (1997), essays about Woodward

External links
Woodward Papers at Yale with short biography
Oral History Interview with C. Vann Woodward from Oral Histories of the American South
Obituary and interview with Woodward's student, James McPherson, 24 December 1999 David Walsh on the World Socialist Web Site
Who Speaks for the Negro Vanderbilt documentary website

1908 births
1999 deaths
Columbia University alumni
Henderson State University alumni
Vanderbilt University faculty
Historians of the Southern United States
Historians from Arkansas
Historians of race relations
Johns Hopkins University faculty
Writers from Arkansas
People from Cross County, Arkansas
Presidents of the American Historical Association
Pulitzer Prize for History winners
Bancroft Prize winners
University of North Carolina at Chapel Hill alumni
Yale University faculty
Georgia Tech faculty
Historians of the American Civil War
20th-century American historians
American male non-fiction writers
People from Morrilton, Arkansas
People from Arkadelphia, Arkansas
Corresponding Fellows of the British Academy
Harold Vyvyan Harmsworth Professors of American History
Yale Sterling Professors
20th-century American male writers
Fulbright alumni
Members of the American Philosophical Society
Members of the American Academy of Arts and Letters